The 2006 Russian First Division was the 14th edition of Russian First Division. There were 22 teams.

League table

See also
2005 Russian Premier League

References
 PFL

2
Russian First League seasons
Russia
Russia